St Patrick's GAC is a Gaelic Athletic Association in County Antrim. The club was founded in 1950 and the current playing field is situated in Lisburn. The GAA club currently plays Gaelic football only and has the ranks from juvenile up to senior. The club participates in competitions organized by Antrim county board.

History 
Founded in 1965 (but unofficially in 1950) the GAA club started out doing only Gaelic Football but has enjoyed a spell of hurling in 2007 but ending due to coach numbers in hurling. It also has a Scor group which enjoyed general success.

U-10 
(U-10 U-8 and U-6 included) These teams are gaining strength and many of them have gone on to play for the U-12 which enjoy great success.

U12 
Due to the GAA's decision to start the go games format of an A and B team. This squad are coming on well with 2 defeats in 8 matches.

Crest 
The St Pat's crest consists of a flame, a castle, and the red hand of Ulster.

External links 
Official St Patrick's Club website

1950 establishments in Northern Ireland
Gaelic games clubs in County Down
Gaelic football clubs in County Down